Robert Poinsette is an American former Negro league pitcher who played in the 1930s.

Poinsette played for the New York Black Yankees in 1939, and also played for the Toledo Crawfords that season. In three recorded games on the mound, he posted a 15.43 ERA over 4.2 innings.

References

External links
 and Seamheads

Year of birth missing
Place of birth missing
New York Black Yankees players
Toledo Crawfords players
Baseball pitchers